Persia is a town in Cattaraugus County, New York, United States. The population was 2,203 at the 2020 census. It is in the northwest part of the county. The village of Gowanda is partially in the town.

Name 
A question frequently asked is "How did Town of Persia get its name?". Newspaper archives and history books do not give a small clue to the origin of the name.

Etymology 
From Latin Persia, from Ancient Greek Περσίς (Persís), from Old Persian 𐎱𐎠𐎼𐎿 (Pārsa), another name for Iran.

History 

The area that would become the town was first settled circa 1812. The town of Persia was founded in 1835 from the town of Perrysburg.

Geography

The northern border of the town is partly formed by Cattaraugus Creek, with Erie County on the opposite bank, and the east town line is defined by the South Branch of Cattaraugus Creek.

U.S. Route 62 passes through the northwest corner of the town, and New York State Route 353 passes across the south part of the town. Much of the town is served by the north-to-south Broadway Road (County Road 4), which runs from NY 353 into the village of Gowanda, which occupies the northern tip of the town and extends across Cattaraugus Creek into the town of Collins in Erie County.

Adjacent towns and areas 
(Clockwise)
Collins 
Otto 
New Albion 
Dayton; Perrysburg

Demographics

As of the census of 2000 For Persia, there were 2,512 people, 961 households, and 602 families residing in the town.  The population density was 120.0 people per square mile (46.3/km2).  There were 1,071 housing units at an average density of 51.2 per square mile (19.8/km2).  The racial makeup of the town was 95.74% White, 0.28% African American, 2.51% Native American, 0.36% Asian, 0.04% from other races, and 1.07% from two or more races. Hispanic or Latino of any race were 0.88% of the population.

There were 961 households, out of which 29.7% had children under the age of 18 living with them, 46.2% were married couples living together, 11.9% had a female householder with no husband present, and 37.3% were non-families. 31.3% of all households were made up of individuals, and 15.2% had someone living alone who was 65 years of age or older.  The average household size was 2.41 and the average family size was 3.03.

In the town, the population was spread out, with 24.8% under the age of 18, 6.5% from 18 to 24, 26.0% from 25 to 44, 20.2% from 45 to 64, and 22.4% who were 65 years of age or older.  The median age was 40 years. For every 100 females, there were 88.4 males.  For every 100 females age 18 and over, there were 84.0 males.

The median income for a household in the town was $33,675, and the median income for a family was $39,650. Males had a median income of $29,838 versus $26,304 for females. The per capita income for the town was $15,590.  About 10.6% of families and 13.1% of the population were below the poverty line, including 18.6% of those under age 18 and 11.1% of those age 65 or over.

Education and language

Language Spoken at Home (2017)

Educational Attainment (2017)

List of supervisors 
(Town of Persia Supervisor);

 Esek B. Nash, 1835-1836
 John Thatcher, 1837-1838
 tEsek B. Nash, 1839
 John Thatcher, 1840-1841
 George W. White, 1842
 Seth Field, 1843
 Esek B. Nash, 1844
 John Thatcher, 1845
 Esek B. Nash, 1846-1848
 Amasa L. Chaffee, 1853
 Levi W. Strope, 1854
 David N. Brown, 1855-1856
 Lemuel S. Jenks, 1857-1868
 Wm. W. Henry, 1869-1870
 A.S. Bennett, 1871-1872
 Charles W. Blackney, 1873-1874
 Silas Vinton, 1875-1877
 Reuben Ross, 1878
 Silas Vinton, 1879-1880
 Ward Hooker, 1881-1882
 Byron L. Kimble, 1883-1884
 Frank C. Vinton, 1885-1887
 Joseph H.Schaack, 1888
 Frank C. Vinton, 1889-1991
 Frank L. Mattock, 1891-1893
 H. Ward Hooker, 1894
 George B. Taylor, 1895-1897
Irving R. Leonard, 1898-1917
Robert E. Congdom, 1918-1933
Stanley Nielson, 1934-1937
George Lambert, 1938-1955
Andrew J. Musacchio, 1956-1963
Charles Deneen, 1964-1969

Annual events

Hollywood Happening 
June is the month for the Annual Hollywood Happening. Part of Main Street is closed to vehicle traffic so hundreds of individuals from all over can come to display their motorcycles and take part in the "Harley" Parade on Friday evening. There are vendors, live music, great food, and various activities to partake.

Christmas Lighting 
In December, a Christmas tree lighting ceremony is held in Chang Hu Park, sponsored by the Gowanda Chamber of Commerce.

Communities and Locations in the Town of Persia 

Gowanda – Part of the village of Gowanda is located in the northwest corner of the town.
Persia – The hamlet of Persia is located south of Gowanda near the west town line.
Snyders Corners – A hamlet at the junction of County Road 4 and NY-353 in the south part of the town.
Zoar Valley Multiple Use Area – A small part of this conservation area is in the north part of the town.

References

External links
Town of Persia official website
 Early history of Persia, NY

Populated places established in 1835
Towns in Cattaraugus County, New York
1835 establishments in New York (state)